John Francis "Jack" Smith Jr. (born April 6, 1938) is an American businessman and executive who formerly served as COO in 1992, CEO from 1992 to 2000 and then chairman of the board of directors of General Motors from 1996 to 2000.

He later served as non-executive chairman of the board of directors of Delta Air Lines from 2004 to 2007. He also served as member of board of Procter & Gamble from 1995-2008 and also Suzuki Motor Corporation.

Early life and education
Smith was born in Worcester, Massachusetts.

He graduated from Saint John's High School in Shrewsbury, Massachusetts and later received his Bachelor of Business Administration from the University of Massachusetts Amherst in 1960 and his Master of Business Administration from Boston University in 1965. While at the University of Massachusetts Amherst he was initiated into the Kappa Sigma fraternity.

Career
He joined General Motors as a payroll auditor in 1961, moving to its financial group in New York City in 1966.  He went on to hold positions ranging from director of international planning to president of GM Canada, president of GM Europe and head of international operations.

As CEO of GM, he undertook one of its most sweeping reorganizations, overturning a cumbersome and inefficient structure created in the 1920s by Alfred P. Sloan and left virtually unchanged since then. Starting with purchasing in 1992 and ending with engineering in 2003, he brought together separate overlapping functions related to the various divisions that formed the company, while also expanding operations into Asia.  In this transformation, which included terminating the Oldsmobile brand, over 90% of core management positions were eliminated, corporate decision-making became faster and easier, production efficiencies and quality improved by spreading the lean manufacturing Toyota Production System from NUMMI, and, above all, the bottom line went from near-bankruptcy losses to decent profits. After he relinquished the CEO position in 2000 to his personally selected successor, Rick Wagoner, he continued on as Chairman to see his plan fully executed.
   
Along with his chairmanship of Delta, Smith is currently a director of several other entities, including Procter & Gamble and The Nature Conservancy. Smith is a trustee of Boston University.

References

External links

Living people
1938 births
American chief executives in the automobile industry
General Motors former executives
Businesspeople from Worcester, Massachusetts
Isenberg School of Management alumni
University of Massachusetts Amherst alumni
Boston University School of Management alumni
20th-century American businesspeople